Vital Panasyuk (born 9 February 1980) is a Belarusian former professional footballer.

Honours
Dinamo Brest
Belarusian Cup winner: 2006–07

External links

1980 births
Living people
Belarusian footballers
FC BATE Borisov players
FC Dynamo Brest players
FC Granit Mikashevichi players
FC Vitebsk players
FC Belshina Bobruisk players
FC Smorgon players
Navbahor Namangan players
Belarusian expatriate footballers
Expatriate footballers in Uzbekistan
FC RUOR Minsk players
FC Kobrin players
Association football defenders
Sportspeople from Brest, Belarus